Events from the year 1919 in Ireland.

Events

21 January – Dáil Éireann meets for the very first time in the Round Room of the Mansion House, Dublin. It comprises Sinn Féin members elected in the 1918 general election who, in accordance with their manifesto, have not taken their seats in the Parliament of the United Kingdom but chosen to declare an independent Irish Republic. In the first shots of the Irish War of Independence, two Royal Irish Constabulary (RIC) members are killed by Volunteers of the Third Tipperary Brigade in the Soloheadbeg Ambush in Tipperary.
27 January – general strike call over working hours led by engineering workers in Glasgow and Belfast; in Belfast the strike collapses after a month.
3 February – Éamon de Valera, the leader of Sinn Féin, John Milroy and John McGarry escaped from Lincoln Prison in England in a break arranged by Sinn Féin members including Michael Collins and Harry Boland.
1 April – fifty-two members of Sinn Féin attend the second meeting of Dáil Éireann. Seán T. O'Kelly is elected Ceann Comhairle and Éamon de Valera is elected President of Dáil Éireann.
2 April – Constance Markievicz is appointed Minister for Labour, becoming the first Irish female Cabinet Minister (the only one for sixty years) and the first in Western Europe.
15–19 April – "Limerick Soviet": a general strike called by the Limerick Trades and Labour Council, as a protest against the declaration of a "Special Military Area" under the Defence of the Realm Act covering of most of the city of Limerick and its surroundings.
18 April – 1,000 delegates from all over Ireland attend the Sinn Féin Ard-Fheis in Dublin. Éamon de Valera is elected President of the organisation.
19 April – Sinn Féin proposes an Executive Council of the Irish National Alliance to challenge the right of any foreign parliament to make laws for Ireland.
13 May – two Royal Irish Constabulary members are killed and Irish Republican Army volunteers, Dan Breen and Seán Treacy are wounded while rescuing Seán Hogan from a guarded train carriage at Knocklong, County Limerick.
17 May – the first Republican law court is set up, at Ballinrobe, County Mayo.
14 June – Captain Alcock and Lieutenant Brown arrive in Clifden, County Galway following their 1,900-mile transatlantic flight.
18 June – Dáil establishes the National Arbitration Courts.
30 July – first assassination of a Royal Irish Constabulary officer carried out by The Squad (Irish Republican Army unit), newly formed under the orders of Michael Collins, when Detective Sergeant Pat "the Dog" Smyth of G division is shot near Drumcondra, Dublin.
12 August – St Colman's Cathedral, Cobh, is consecrated.
8 September – "The sack of Fermoy": drunken British forces rampage through Fermoy following an inquest on the previous death of a British soldier which fails to find for murder.
12 September – Dáil Éireann is declared illegal by the British authorities. There are raids on Sinn Féin centres and Ernest Blythe is arrested.
4 November – the British Cabinet's Irish Committee settles on a policy of creating two Home Rule parliaments – one in Dublin and one in Belfast – with a Council of Ireland to provide a framework for possible unity.
12 November – Mitchelstown Creameries, predecessor of Dairygold, opens for business as a co-operative.
19 December – volunteers from Dublin and Tipperary under the leadership of Paddy Daly undertake an ambush on Lord French's motorcade of three cars at Ashtown Road in Dublin. Lord French is the British Viceroy, Lord Lieutenant of Ireland and Supreme Commander of the British Army in Ireland. While three of French's party – two RIC and a driver – are wounded, French gets through unharmed. Volunteer Martin Savage is killed and Dan Breen wounded.
23 December – Irish Land (Provision for Soldiers and Sailors) Act passed by the Parliament of the United Kingdom, empowering the Irish Land Commission to provide housing for any men who had served in the British forces.
Yitzhak HaLevi Herzog, previously Chief Rabbi of Belfast, is appointed to serve in Dublin.

Arts and literature
 October – W. B. Yeats travels to the United States and begins a lecture tour lasting until May 1920. In this year also Yeats publishes a major revision of The Wild Swans at Coole (including "An Irish Airman Foresees His Death" "The Phases of the Moon", "The Scholars" and "On being asked for a War Poem"), Two Plays for Dancers and "A Prayer for My Daughter".
 Ina Boyle's orchestral rhapsody The Magic Harp is premiered.
 Harry Clarke's illustrations to an edition of Tales of Mystery & Imagination are published.
 Francis Ledwidge's Complete Poems are published posthumously, edited by Lord Dunsany.
 C. S. Lewis, writing as Clive Hamilton, publishes Spirits in Bondage: a cycle of lyrics, his first published work, in London.
 Seumas O'Kelly's novella The Golden Barque and The Weaver's Grave are published posthumously.
 'An Seabhac' (Pádraig Ó Siochfhradha)'s semi-autobiographical comic story Jimín Mháire Thaidhg is published.

Sport

Gaelic Athletic Association (GAA)
All Ireland Senior Hurling Final
Cork 6–4 d Dublin 2–4
All Ireland Senior Football Final
Kildare 2–5 d Galway 0–1

Football
Irish League
Winners: Belfast Celtic
Irish Cup
Winners: Linfield 2–1 Glentoran
International
25 October Ireland 1–1 England (in Belfast)

Births
26 January – Tom Aherne, soccer player (died 1999)
30 January – Robert Lowry, Baron Lowry, Lord Chief Justice of Northern Ireland (died 1999)
23 February – Johnny Carey, soccer player and manager (died 1995)
18 March – G. E. M. Anscombe, analytic philosopher (died 2001)
3 April – Myles McKeon, Roman Catholic Bishop of Bunbury, Australia (died 2016)
3 April – Eoghan Ó Tuairisc, poet and writer (died 1982)
9 April – Gordon Lambert, art collector, member of the Seanad (died 2005)
1 May – Dan O'Herlihy, actor (died 2005)
5 May – Séamus Ennis, Uilleann piper, singer and folk-song collector (died 1982)
9 May – Joseph Bermingham, Irish Labour Party TD (died 1995)
9 May – Anne Yeats, painter and stage designer (died 2001)
8 June – Constantine Fitzgibbon, historian and novelist (died 1983)
10 June – Kevin O'Flanagan, physician, rugby and soccer player and Olympic official (died 2006)
7 July – Fred Kiernan, soccer player (died 1981)
15 July – Iris Murdoch, novelist and philosopher (died 1999)
21 July – Roderick Gill, cricketer (died 1983)
1 August – Dave Creedon, Cork hurler (died 2007)
15 August – Benedict Kiely, writer, broadcaster and journalist (died 2007)
15 September – Michael ffrench-O'Carroll, Independent TD and Senator (died 2007)
2 October – Sean 'ac Donncha, traditional singer (died 1996)
25 October – Jimmy Rudd, soccer player (died 1985)
27 October – James Joseph Magennis, British Royal Navy submariner awarded Victoria Cross for taking part in Operation Struggle in 1945 (died 1986)
1 November – Gerard Slevin, Chief Herald of Ireland (died 1997)
5 November – Seamus Twomey, twice chief of staff of the Provisional Irish Republican Army (died 1989)
15 November – Tony Reddin, Tipperary hurler (died 2015)
11 December – Digby McLaren, geologist and palaeontologist in Canada (died 2004)
Full date unknown
Vivian Mercier, literary critic (died 1989)
J. J. O'Reilly, Cavan Gaelic footballer (died 1952)

Deaths
9 January – John Danaher, soldier, recipient of the Victoria Cross for gallantry in 1881 near Pretoria, South Africa (born 1860).
13 February – William Temple, recipient of the Victoria Cross for gallantry in 1863 at Rangiriri, New Zealand (born 1833).
21 February – John O'Connor Power, Irish Nationalist politician and MP (born 1846).
6 March – Pierce McCan, member of 1st Dáil representing Tipperary East.
20 March – William Hone, cricketer (born 1842).
30 April – John Pentland Mahaffy, classicist (born 1839).
8 June – Coslett Herbert Waddell, priest and botanist (born 1858).
25 June – William Martin Murphy, Nationalist (Irish Parliamentary Party) MP, newspaper proprietor, leader of employer's syndicate in the Dublin Lockout of 1913 (born 1844).
25 July – Samuel McCaughey, pastoralist, politician and philanthropist in Australia (born 1835).
5 September – Joseph Ivess, member of the New Zealand House of Representatives (born 1844).
31 December – Con Lehane, socialist active in the Irish Socialist Republican Party, the Social Democratic Federation, and the Socialist Party of Great Britain (born 1877).
Full date unknown
Patrick Egan, treasurer of the Irish Land League, fled to the United States, United States Minister to Chile (born 1841).

References

 
1910s in Ireland
Ireland
Years of the 20th century in Ireland